is a railway station on the Meitetsu Hiromi Line in the city of Kani, Gifu, Japan, operated by the private railway operator Nagoya Railroad (Meitetsu).

Lines

Layout
The station has a bay platform with two bays, serving three tracks. Platform 1 serves trains bound for Mitake. Although the line from Shin Kani to Mitake is a continuation of the same Hiromi Line from Inuyama, the lines are physically disconnected at Shin Kani Station and passengers wishing to go beyond Shin Kani must transfer at this station. There is a second wicket within the station for such passengers. Therefore, passengers transferring must pass through one set of gates, and passengers starting their trip at Shin Kani must pass through two sets of gates. Platform 1 supports trains with no more than two cars, so only wanman driver-only operation trains can go from Shin Kani to Mitake.

Platform 2 and Platform 3 both serve trains bound for Inuyama. Platform 2 can support trains with no more than 4 cars, and Platform 3 can support trains with no more than 6 cars.

There is one exit. When leaving, there is a convenience store on the left and ticket machines and a staff window on the right.  Outside the station are taxis and on the station's right, when exiting, is the JR Central Kani Station.

Platforms

Adjacent stations

History
It was renamed  on 16 February 1930, and was renamed Shin Kani Station on 1 April 1982.

Surrounding area
 Kani Station (JR Central)
 Kani City Hall

See also
 List of railway stations in Japan

References

External links

  

Railway stations in Gifu Prefecture
Railway stations in Japan opened in 1928
Stations of Nagoya Railroad
Kani, Gifu